Bruno Cornet (born 3 July 1977) is a Paraguayan fencer. He competed in the individual sabre event at the 1996 Summer Olympics.

References

External links
 

1977 births
Living people
Paraguayan male sabre fencers
Olympic fencers of Paraguay
Fencers at the 1996 Summer Olympics
20th-century Paraguayan people